Harivamsha Purana (हरिवंश पुराण) may refer to:

Harivamsha, the Vaishnava text 
Harivamsa Purana, an 8th-century Jain text by Jinasena of Punnata lineage